R. Manimaran may refer to:

R. Manimaran, AIADMK politician elected in 1977 and 1980
R. Manimaran (Dindigul MLA), DMK politician elected in 1996
R. Manimaran (Poonamallee MLA), AIADMK politician elected in 2011